The French schooner Ortensia (or Hortensia), launched at Venice in 1807, was the second of three Psiche-class schooners. All three served in Napoleon's Italian navy. After  captured her at the Brionian Islands, the Royal Navy took Ortensia into service as HMS Ortenzia. The Navy sold her at Malta in 1812.

Capture
On the morning of 16 July 1808, Captain John Holligsworth of Minstrel was off Veruda, when he observed a schooner anchor off "Paul's". As Minstrel approached, the crew of the schooner fired her guns at Minstrel and then ran schooner ashore "on one of the Bryone Islands", where they abandoned her. The schooner turned out to be the Italian schooner Ortenzia, pierced for 16 guns but carrying only ten. She had had a crew of 56 men under the command of lieutenant de fregate Stalamini. Hollingsworth opined that she would be useful in His Majesty's service as she was a "very fast sailing Vessel... Copper bottomed, nearly new".

Royal Navy service
The Royal Navy commissioned her in 1809 under the command of Lieutenant Edward Blaquiere.

On 22 June 1810 Ortenzia was off the coast of Calabria. When , Commander John Toup Nicholas, arrived, Blaquiere informed Toup that a French convoy of 51 vessels were anchored off Cirella, a small town some 30 miles south of the Gulf of Policastro. The next day Pilot and Ortenzia came up under sweeps, the wind being calm, and observed that the convoy was under the escort of five settees and eight gunboats. Ortensia, assisted by boats from Pilot chased the convoy, firing on it. The British succeeded in causing five of the largest merchant vessels to run ashore north of the town and some of the others to seek refuge under a battery. However, the arrival of more escorts and the tiredness of the British sailors, who had been at the sweeps for nine hours, led Toup to call off the attack. In the evening Pilots boats tried to destroy the vessels on the beach, but heavy small arms fire drove them off. Pilot and Ortenzia then destroyed the vessels with gunfire. British casualties included three men killed.

Fate
The Navy sold her at Malta on 6 November 1812.

Notes

Citations

References
Fọlayan, Kọla  (1979) Tripoli during the reign of Yūsūf Pāshā Qaramānlī. (University of Ife Press).
 
 

1807 ships
Schooners of the French Navy
Captured ships
Schooners of the Royal Navy
Ships built in Venice
Napoleonic-era ships